Heavenly Parents is the term used in Mormonism to refer collectively to the divine partnership of God the Father and a Heavenly Mother who are believed to be parents of human spirits. The concept traces its origins to Joseph Smith, the founder of the Latter Day Saint movement.

The Heavenly Parents doctrine is taught by the Church of Jesus Christ of Latter-day Saints (LDS Church), the Restoration Church of Jesus Christ, and branches of Mormon fundamentalism, such as the Apostolic United Brethren. The doctrine of a husband and wife spiritual parents is not generally recognized by other denominations within the Latter Day Saint movement, such as the Community of Christ.

Teachings on Heavenly Parents

In the largest denomination of Mormonism, the LDS Church, the doctrine of "heavenly parents" is not frequently discussed; however, the doctrine can be found in some publications and hymns. In 1845, after the death of Smith, the poet Eliza Roxcy Snow published a poem now used as the lyrics in the Latter-day Saint hymn "O My Father", which discusses heavenly parents. The poem contained the following language:

The doctrine is also attributed to several other early church leaders. According to one sermon by Brigham Young, Smith once said he "would not worship a God who had not a father; and I do not know that he would if he had not a mother; the one would be as absurd as the other."

In 1995 top LDS leaders released "The Family: A Proclamation to the World", which outlined key teachings on family and gender, and which affirms, "All human beings—male and female—are created in the image of God. Each is a beloved spirit son or daughter of heavenly parents, and, as such, each has a divine nature and destiny." Since 2019, the LDS church's theme for its Young Women's program says: "I am a beloved daughter of Heavenly Parents, with a divine nature and eternal destiny." The LDS Church teaches that humanity's Heavenly Parents want Their children to be like Them, and that through the process of exaltation all humans have the potential to live eternally in Their presence, continue as families, become gods, create worlds, and have their own spirit children over which they will govern as divine parents.

Polygamous Heavenly Parents

Polygamy has played an important part in Mormon history and multiple Mormon denominations have teachings on the existence of Heavenly Parents meaning a polygamous Heavenly Father married to multiple Heavenly Mothers. Brigham Young taught that God the Father was polygamous, although teachings on Heavenly Mothers were never as popular. These teachings disappeared from official rhetoric after the end of LDS polygamy in 1904 (though existing polygynous marriages lasted into the 1950s).

References

Mormonism
Conceptions of God
God in Christianity
Latter Day Saint doctrines regarding deity
Mormonism-related controversies
New religious movement deities
Feminist spirituality
Latter Day Saint terms
Mother goddesses
Mormonism and women
Mormon feminism